Herald Express may refer to:

Los Angeles Herald-Express formed in 1931 of merger of existing Los Angeles Express (founded 1871) and Los Angeles Herald (founded 1873). The newspaper merged in with Los Angeles Examiner (founded  1903) to continue as Los Angeles Herald Examiner folding in 1969 
Torquay Herald Express, a local newspaper founded in 1925 covering the Torbay area of the United Kingdom.